Stephen J. Milner is a British scholar of Italian. Since 2006, he has been the Serena Professor of Italian at the University of Manchester. He was the Director of the British School at Rome from 2017 to 2020.

Selected works

References

Living people
Linguists from the United Kingdom
Academics of the University of Manchester
Year of birth missing (living people)
Place of birth missing (living people)